Tarlov cysts, are type II innervated meningeal cysts, cerebrospinal-fluid-filled (CSF) sacs most frequently located in the spinal canal of the sacral region of the spinal cord (S1–S5) and much less often in the cervical, thoracic or lumbar spine. They can be distinguished from other meningeal cysts by their nerve-fiber-filled walls. Tarlov cysts are defined as cysts formed within the nerve-root sheath at the dorsal root ganglion.  The etiology of these cysts is not well understood; some current theories explaining this phenomenon have not yet been tested or challenged but include increased pressure in CSF, filling of congenital cysts with one-way valves, inflammation in response to trauma and disease. They are named for American neurosurgeon Isadore Tarlov, who described them in 1938.

Tarlov cysts are relatively uncommon when compared to other neurological cysts. Initially, Isadore Tarlov believed them to be asymptomatic, however as his research progressed, Tarlov found them to be symptomatic in a number of patients. These cysts are often detected incidentally during MRI or CT scans for other medical conditions. They are also observed using magnetic resonance neurography with communicating subarachnoid cysts of the spinal meninges. Cysts with diameters of 1 cm or larger are more likely to be symptomatic; although cysts of any size may be symptomatic dependent on location and etiology. Some 40% of patients with symptomatic Tarlov cysts can associate a history of trauma or childbirth. Current treatment options include CSF aspiration, fibrin-glue therapy, laminectomy with wrapping of the cyst, among other surgical treatment approaches. Interventional treatment of Tarlov cysts is the only means by which symptoms might permanently be resolved due to the fact that the cysts often refill after aspiration. Tarlov cysts often enlarge over time, especially if the sac has a check valve type opening. They are differentiated from other meningeal and arachnoid cysts because they are innervated and diagnosis can in cases be demonstrated with subarachnoid communication.

Tarlov perineural cysts have occasionally been observed in patients with Marfan syndrome, Ehlers–Danlos syndrome, and Loeys–Dietz syndrome.

Signs and symptoms

Appearance
Walls of Tarlov cysts are thin and fibrous; they are prone to rupture if touched, making surgery difficult. The nerve fibers embedded in the walls of the cysts have the appearance and size of dental floss; these nerve fibers are usually not arranged in any specific alignment. Histologic examination reveals the Tarlov-cyst outer wall is composed of vascular connective tissue, and the inner wall is lined with flattened arachnoid tissue. In addition, part of the lining containing nerve fibers also occasionally contains ganglion cells.

Location 
Tarlov cysts are most commonly located in the S1 to S4/S5 region of the spinal canal, but can be found along any region of the spine. They usually form on the extradural components of sacrococcygeal nerve roots at the junction of dorsal root ganglion and posterior nerve roots and arise between the endoneurium and perineurium. Occasionally, these cysts are observed in the lumbar and thoracic spine. However, these cysts most commonly arise at the S2 or S3 junction of the dorsal nerve root ganglion. The cysts are often multiple, extending around the circumference of the nerve, and can enlarge over time to compress neighboring nerve roots, to cause bone erosion. The cysts may be found anterior to the sacral area and have been known to extend into the abdominal cavity.

Difference between Tarlov cysts and other spinal meningeal cysts 
The following table is compilation of some key differences between Tarlov cysts, meningeal cysts, and arachnoid diverticula cysts. Although the definitions for each entity are still controversial, the following items are generally accepted.

Symptoms 
Tarlov cysts are likely highly underdiagnosed as it was Isadore Tarlov's later research that led him to the understanding of their symptomology. Symptoms are based on the locations of the cysts along the spine, and follow general pathology of spinal injury:
 Pain
 Paresthesia
 Spasticity, Hypertonia
 Muscular Dysfunction or Weakness
 Radiculopathy

Although they are most frequently reported along sacral regions, they are rarely seen in other locations along the spine. Women are more likely to exhibit symptoms  They can also appear in clusters or bilaterally along the spine, thus symptoms can be unilateral, bilateral, or with symptoms more dominant on one side. The cases of reported symptomatic Tarlov cysts ranges from 15% to 30% of the overall reported Tarlov cyst case, depending on the source of literature. Nevertheless, these cysts are important clinical entities because of their tendency to increase in size over time, potentially causing complications and eroding the surrounding bone tissue. Patients with symptomatic Tarlov cysts near the sacrum (and not other locations of the spine) can be divided into 4 categories, according to their experienced symptoms:
 Group 1 - Pain on tailbones that radiates to the legs with potential weakness;
 Group 2 - Pain on bones, legs, groin area, sexual dysfunctions, and dysfunctional bladder;
 Group 3 - Pain that radiate from the cyst site across hips to the lower abdomen;
 Group 4 - No pain, just sexual dysfunction and dysfunctional bladder.

Common symptoms specific to sacral Tarlov cysts
Below are a list of commonly reported symptoms associated with sacral Tarlov cysts:

Back pain, perineal pain, secondary Sciatica, secondary piriformis muscle dysfunction with tertiary sciatica, Cauda equina syndrome, neurogenic claudication (pain caused by walking), neurogenic bladder,  dysuria, urinary incontinence, coccygodynia, sacral radiculopathy, radicular pain, headaches, retrograde ejaculation, paresthesia, hypesthesia, secondary pelvic floor dysfunction, vaginismus, motor disorders in lower limbs and the genital, perineal, or lumbosacral areas, sacral or buttocks pain, vaginal or penile paraesthesia, Persistent Genital Arousal Disorder (PGAD) characterized by unwanted, unrelenting genital sensory awareness, itch or pain that can persist for days, months, even years)<Komisaruk, B.R. & Lee, H-J. (2012). Prevalence of sacral spinal (Tarlov) cysts in Persistent Genital Arousal Disorder.  J. Sexual Medicine, 9: 2047–2056>, sensory changes over buttocks, perineal area, and lower extremity; difficulty walking; severe lower abdominal pain, bowel dysfunction, intestinal motility disorders like constipation or bowel incontinence.

Cause

Formation 
There are several hypotheses proposed regarding the formation of Tarlov cysts, including: hemorrhagic infiltration of spinal tissue, inflammation within the nerve root cysts followed by inoculation of fluids, developmental or congenital origin, arachnoidal proliferation along and around the exiting sacral nerve root, and breakage of venous drainage in the perineuria and epineurium secondary to hemosiderin deposition after trauma.
Tarlov himself theorized that the perineural cysts form as a result of blockage of venous drainage in the perineurium and epineurium secondary to hemosiderin deposition, after local trauma.
Another theory gaining increasing popularity, over the past decade, is one postulated by Fortuna et al.; it described perineural cysts to be the results of congenital arachnoidal proliferation along the exiting sacral nerve roots. Some research on the migration of inflammatory cell into spinal has been studied. Additionally, in vivo and in vitro studies show inflammation induced by CNS injury causes distinct cystic cavitations created by astrocyte migration.

Hemorrhagic Infiltration 

Many authors state that blood and its breakdown products acting as foreign-body substance in the subarachnoid space produce local adhesive arachnoiditis with no symptoms, but it also can create cystic degeneration. The subarachnoid space abhors all foreign body substances. Even the presence of injected air is considered to be a  "foreign body". Blood definitely is considered a  foreign body, particularly in its breakdown products. Repeated exposure to foreign body substances in the subarachnoid space or spinal injury can initiate auto-immune amnestic reactions which may potentiate and magnify the ongoing inflammatory process causing cystic cavitation in spinal tissue.

Enlargement 
Tarlov cysts are known to have the tendency to enlarge over time. The prominent theory that explains this phenomenon reasons the enlargement of the cysts is due to the cerebrospinal fluid being pushed into the cyst during systole pulsation, but unable to get out during the diastole phase, resulting in enlargement observed in clinical settings over time. Increased ICP from trauma or other injury, childbirth, and overextertion are thought to trigger enlargement along with inflammation and hemorrhagic infiltration. With the cysts often containing a valve like mechanism fluid becomes trapped, and the meningeal sac or nerve sheath grows in size. Some patients have been diagnosed for up to 20 years with little change in size, and those with small stable cysts may avoid much progression of symptoms. Those with generally larger sacral cysts pressed along the sacrum cause the sacrum to become eroded and thin.

Rupture
When Tarlov cysts are ruptured or drained they cause leakage of cerebrospinal fluid (CSF). Ruptures of Tarlov cysts have been reported associated with communicating aneurysms and from fracture in the proximity of the cysts. An undetected rupture can cause intracranial hypotension, including orthostatic neurological symptoms along with headache, nausea, and vomiting that improve when supine. The ruptured cysts can be patched either with a biosynthetic dural patch or using a blood patch to stem the flow of CSF.

Diagnosis 
Both CT and MRI are good imaging procedures that allow the detection of extradural spinal masses such as Tarlov cysts. Magnetic resonance neurography is an emerging imaging technology based on MRI that highlights neurologic tissue. Often cysts are under reported and under diagnosed as radiologists and neurosurgeons have been traditionally taught to ignore these cysts. Patients frequently experience difficulty in diagnosis, however this is changing as Tarlov cysts have now been recognized by NORD as a rare disease.

MRI 

MRI, or Magnetic Resonance Imaging, is considered the imaging study of choice in identifying Tarlov cysts. MRI provides better resolution of tissue density, absence of bone interference, multiplanar capabilities, and is noninvasive. Plain films may show bony erosion of the spinal canal or of the sacral foramina.
On MRI pictures, the signal is the same as the CSF one.

If MRI made with a contrast medium:
 The signal in the cyst is the same as in the dural bag.
 The signal for cysts due to traumas is a little stronger at the periphery or nerve root location.
 The signal is more important for other causes: synovial cysts, dermoïdes or épidermoïdes cysts, teratomes.

CT 
A computed tomography (CT) scan is another examination method often used for the diagnosis of Tarlov cyst. Unenhanced CT scans may show sacral erosion, asymmetric epidural fat distribution, and cystic masses that have the same density with CSF.  CT Myelogram is minimally invasive,  and could be employed when MRI cannot be performed on patient.

Misdiagnosis 
The terms "Tarlov cyst" or "sacral perineural cyst" refer to cystic lesions of the spinal meninges with innervation as well as nerve sheath dilatations with subarchnoid communication. While they were once thought to be a histopathological finding, they can be radiologically confirmed by specialized time lapsed MRI and CT imaging techniques showing subarchnoid communication from the nerve fibers in the cysts. They can also be surgically verified when the nerve fibers are visualized in the cystic sac. Often the cysts cause erosion from enlargement, damaging vertebrae and discs and can be misdiagnosed as primary stenosis or disc herniation.

Classification 
Tarlov cysts are considered Type II lesions, being defined as extradural meningeal cysts with nerve fibers.
Nabors et al. classify Arachnoïd cysts into three types:
 Type I : Extra-dural; no nerve roots or rootlets such as intra-sacral meningoceles; probably of congenital origin developing from the dural sac to which they are connected by a little collar. They are found at the point of exit of a dorsal nerve root from the dural sac. They are sometimes difficult to identify and can be "seen" as a type II cyst on imaging. These cysts are often associated with foramina enlargement and scalloping of the vertebrae. It is very important to distinguish them from sacral meningoceles going to the pelvic area; they are often associated with other congenital abnormalities (teratomes, dermoïdes, lipomes, and other abnormalities(uro-genital and ano-rectal))
 Type II: Extra-dural; nerve root present (such as Tarlov or perineural cysts). There are often not only one but multiple cysts, mostly found in the sacrum area. There are two types: Tarlov (perineural) cysts are located posteriorly to the root ganglion, with nerve fibres inside or nerve tissue in the walls; they are not communicating with the perineural arachnoid space. Type-II cysts are very small in the upper sacral area, but can be bigger (up to ) if found located in the lower part of the sacrum. The second variant of type-II cysts are called "meningeal diverticuli". They are located anteriorly to the nerve root ganglion, with nerves fibres inside and communicating with the subarachnoid space.
 Type III: intra-dural; these are either congenital or caused by trauma; they are rarely associated with other abnormalities and rare in occurrence. About 75% can be found in the dorsal area. Most of the congenital type-III cysts can be found posteriorly to the spinal cord, as opposed to those caused by trauma which can be found anteriorly to the spinal cord.Post traumatic inflammation induces cavitation and cystic formation and leads to greater secondary CNS injury. Cellular migration causing these cyst cavities was observed both in vitro and in vivo and cavitation was observed to be prevented with the use of an anti-inflammatory. Further more migration inflammatory cells into traumatized tissue has been observed with inflammation.

Treatment 
Because of the unclear pathogenesis and pathophysiology of Tarlov cysts, there is no consensus on the optimal treatment of symptomatic sacral perineural cysts. Patients often choose to pursue treatment when the progression of neurological deficits seriously impacts their quality of life.
Since cysts are innervated, microfenestration and surgical sleeving of the cysts to diminish the amount of accumulated cerebrospinal fluid and decrease compression of the spine and spinal nerves has been successful in a number of patients. The cysts are carefully separated enough from surrounding tissue to be wrapped with fatty tissue or pericardial biomaterial to excise the fluid from the cyst. If the cyst does not drain spontaneously, then it is drained and patched using a biosynthetic dural patch.
The use of this technique is done in the U.S. and is spreading in Europe but recovery is generally extensive. Microfenestration alone has been done with some success in Asia.
A biopolymer plate is also being used experimentally to strengthen a sacrum thinned by cystic erosion.
The risks of CSF leakage are higher on patients that have bilateral cysts on the same spinal level or clusters of cysts along multiple vertebrae, but immediate recognition of the leakage and repair can mitigate that risk.

Various treatment methods have been tried in the past, including the extraction of cerebrospinal fluids from the cyst, fibrin glue injection and the complete or partial removal of cyst. Epidurals can provide temporary relief but are not generally recommended as they can cause cysts to enlarge. Extraction of fluid can provide limited or no relief depending on rate the cysts refill and the need to repeat the procedure. Removal of the cyst results in irreversible damage to the intersecting spinal nerve.
Although fibrin-glue therapy initially had been thought to be a promising therapy in the treatment of these cysts, there have been multiple problems associated with the fibrin glue therapy including seepage of fibrin. It is no longer  recommended for use at present by the Health Department in some countries and neurosurgeons previously performing the procedures. 
Nevertheless, all types of surgical treatment pose common risks, including neurological deficits, infection and inflammation, spinal headache, urinary disturbances, and leakage of cerebrospinal fluids.

References

External links 

Neurological disorders
Rare diseases